The Algerian barb (Luciobarbus callensis) or Tunisian barb, is a ray-finned fish species in the family Cyprinidae. It is found in Algeria and Tunisia (and perhaps Morocco).

Its natural habitats are rivers, freshwater lakes, and water storage areas. It is not considered a threatened species by the IUCN.

The taxonomy and systematics of the Maghreb barbs are subject to considerable dispute. Some authors include B. antinorii, B. figuiguensis, B. issenensis, B. ksibi, B. labiosa, B. lepineyi, B. massaensis, Carasobarbus moulouyensis, L. pallaryi and L. setivimensis in L. callensis, while others consider them distinct. To further confuse matters, Fishbase considers B. labiosa to be conspecific with the Maghreb barbel (L. maghrebensis), B. lepineyi to be conspecific with L. pallaryi when the latter is considered a distinct species, and C. moulouyensis be placed in the genus Carasobarbus.

References

 

Algerian barb
Freshwater fish of North Africa
Algerian barb
Taxa named by Achille Valenciennes
Cyprinid fish of Africa
Taxonomy articles created by Polbot